William Carbys Zimmerman (1856–1932) was an American architect. He was the Illinois State Architect from 1905 to 1915, designing many state-funded buildings, especially at the University of Illinois.  He was a partner of Flanders & Zimmerman.

Biography
Zimmerman was born in 1856 in Thiensville, Wisconsin, and attended the Massachusetts Institute of Technology. Upon graduation in 1880s he moved to Chicago, Illinois. He was admitted as a junior partner in John J. Flanders' architectural firm in 1886. There, Zimmerman gained a reputation as an able designer of residences in popular revival styles. He became a fellow of the American Institute of Architects and opened an independent practice in Steinway Hall in 1898. Zimmerman at first continued to design houses, largely in the Chicago neighborhoods of Rogers Park, Kenwood, and Edgewater.

Zimmerman was appointed Illinois State Architect in 1905, a role he held for ten years. This presented Zimmerman with the opportunity to design major works on behalf of the state government. He was also named the architect to Chicago's West Park Commission in 1907. During this period, Zimmerman began to shift to a style more influenced by the Prairie School. He later admitted his son and son-in-law as partners of Zimmerman, Saxe, and Zimmerman.

List of works
All buildings in Illinois unless otherwise noted
William Carbys Zimmerman House, Chicago, 1887
Eckhart & Swan Mill, Chicago, 1897
Archer Daniels Midland Wheat Mill (1897), Chicago
5544 S. Woodlawn Avenue, Chicago, 1898
Gross House, 1100 and 1106 Oak Avenue, Evanston, 1901
Charles Adams Goodyear House, Chicago, 1902
Nichols House, Winnetka, 1905
Joseph Downey House, Chicago, 1906
Percy Eckhart House, Kenilworth, 1906
Frank K. Hoover House, Chicago, 1906
William M. Crilly House, Chicago, 1908
Illinois Supreme Court Building, Springfield, Illinois, 1908
Pinewold, Lake Forest, 1908
University of Illinois Natural History Building additions, Urbana, 1909 and 1910
Ray O. West House, Chicago, 1909
W. B. Wolff House, Chicago, 1909
William O. Johnson House, Chicago, 1910
Warren House, 2829 Sheridan Place, Evanston, 1912
University of Illinois Commerce Building (now the David Dodds Henry Administration Building), Urbana, 1912
University of Illinois English Building renovation, Urbana, 1913
Pulaski Park, Chicago, 1914
University of Illinois Armory, Urbana, 1914
Stateville Correctional Center, Crest Hill, Illinois 1917 - 1925
Thomas Cusack Co. District Headquarters, Davenport, Iowa, 1922
Aurora Elks Lodge No. 705, Aurora, 1926
Vitagraph Film Exchange Building, Kansas City, Missouri, 1930
Col. Roger Hosmer Morse House, Lake Forest, 1931
Walgreen Drug Store/La Epoca Department Store, Downtown Miami Historic District, 1936
University of Illinois Physics Building, Urbana
Chicago 7th Regiment Armory, Chicago
Douglass Park Refectory, Chicago
Oak Woods Cemetery Chapel and Crematory
Louis F. Swift House, Lake Forest
University of Illinois Stock Pavilion, Urbana

References

1856 births
1932 deaths
Architects from Wisconsin
Architects from Illinois
Massachusetts Institute of Technology alumni
People from Thiensville, Wisconsin